Linha do Alentejo is a railway line which connects Barreiro and Funcheira, in Portugal. The first section, from Barreiro to Bombel, was opened in 1857 as Caminho de Ferro do Sul; the section between Barreiro, Beja, and Tunes was classified as Linha do Sul at the start of the 20th century, and, in 1992, the section between Barreiro, Beja Funcheira was classified as Linha do Alentejo.

See also 
 List of railway lines in Portugal
 List of Portuguese locomotives and railcars
 History of rail transport in Portugal

References

Sources

Literature
 

Railway lines opened in 1857
Ale
Iberian gauge railways